Father Capodanno Boulevard, formerly Seaside Boulevard, is the primary north-south artery that runs through the Arrochar, South Beach, Ocean Breeze, Midland Beach, and New Dorp Beach neighborhoods of the New York City borough of Staten Island. The boulevard runs parallel to the South Beach Boardwalk and its public park.

History
Fr. Capodanno Boulevard was originally conceived by New York City parks commissioner Robert Moses, as the northernmost stretch of a planned limited-access highway to be named Shore Front Drive. The road was built in 1955–1958 as Seaside Boulevard, as part of an improvement to the boardwalk. The first section of the boulevard opened in 1957. The name was changed in 1976 to honor Vincent R. Capodanno, a local Roman Catholic chaplain who was killed in the Vietnam War in 1967.

Description 
The road exists today as the primary boulevard for the communities and public parks of Staten Island's East Shore. The road currently consists of six vehicular lanes: four driving lanes, a parking lane with turning bays southbound and a bus lane northbound. Previously existing bicycle lanes were removed in 2010 "without any discernible public process". Northbound and southbound traffic is divided by a grassy center median. To avoid Hylan Boulevard's traffic congestion, Father Capodanno Boulevard is also used as a "short cut" to the Verrazzano-Narrows Bridge by residents of the island's more inland and southern communities.

The S51/S81 and S52 local buses use this street, as do the  express routes to and from Manhattan.

The entire boulevard suffered extensive damage and flooding during Hurricane Sandy in October 2012. The East Shore Seawall will roughly parallel the road.

Major intersections
Major intersections include:
 Lily Pond Avenue (northern end)
 Sand Lane
 Seaview Avenue
 Slater Boulevard
 Hunter Avenue
 Midland Avenue
 Lincoln Avenue
 Greeley Avenue

References

Streets in Staten Island
Vietnam War monuments and memorials in the United States